Statistics of Emperor's Cup in the 1992 season.

Overview
It was contested by 32 teams, and Yokohama Marinos won the championship.

This was the first edition featuring the rebranded top-flight clubs for the emerging J. League.

Results

1st round
Verdy Kawasaki 2–0 Fukuoka University
Yamaha Motors 4–0 Toho Titanium SC
Sanfrecce Hiroshima 2–0 Doshisha University
Mitsubishi Motors Mizushima 0–5 Gamba Osaka
Urawa Red Diamonds 2–1 Anfini Sapporo
YKK 0–4 Fujitsu
NKK 2–3 Yanmar Diesel
Nippon Steel Yawata 1–8 Kashima Antlers
Nagoya Grampus Eight 1–3 Fujita Industries
Honda 1–0 NEC Yamagata
Keio University 3–2 Kyoto Shiko
Otsuka Pharmaceutical 0–3 JEF United Ichihara
Yokohama Marinos 8–0 Kanazawa Club
Osaka University of Commerce 3–4 Yokohama Flügels
Toshiba 5–6 Chuo Bohan
Kawasaki Steel 0–3 Shimizu S-Pulse

2nd round
Verdy Kawasaki 1–0 Yamaha Motors
Sanfrecce Hiroshima 2–3 Gamba Osaka
Urawa Red Diamonds 3–0 Fujitsu
Yanmar Diesel 1–2 Kashima Antlers
Fujita Industries 3–1 Honda
Keio University 0–1 JEF United Ichihara
Yokohama Marinos 4–2 Yokohama Flügels
Chuo Bohan 1–4 Shimizu S-Pulse

Quarterfinals
Verdy Kawasaki 1–1 (PK 4–2) Gamba Osaka
Urawa Red Diamonds 2–1 Kashima Antlers
Fujita Industries 1–0 JEF United Ichihara
Yokohama Marinos 4–3 Shimizu S-Pulse

Semifinals
Verdy Kawasaki 2–2 (PK 4–3) Urawa Red Diamonds
Fujita Industries 0–1 Yokohama Marinos

Final

Verdy Kawasaki 1–2 Yokohama Marinos
Yokohama Marinos won the championship.

References
 NHK

Emperor's Cup
Emp
1993 in Japanese football